Tchien Airport  is an airport serving the town of Zwedru, in Tchien District, Grand Gedeh County, Liberia.

See also
Transport in Liberia

References

 OurAirports - Tchien
 Great Circle Mapper - Tchien

Airports in Liberia